Haywire is an album released by American country music artist Chris LeDoux. Overall, it is his 26th album and his last under the Liberty banner before it was renamed Capitol Records. "Honky Tonk World", "Tougher Than the Rest", and "Dallas Days and Fort Worth Nights" were released as singles. The album peaked at #17 on the Billboard Top Country Albums chart.

Content
There are two cover songs on this album. "Tougher Than the Rest" was written and recorded by Bruce Springsteen for his 1987 album, Tunnel of Love. "Billy The Kid" is a cover of Charlie Daniels' 1976 song from the album, High Lonesome. "Big Love" would later be recorded and made popular by Tracy Byrd from his album of the same name.

Track listing

Personnel
As listed in liner notes
Gary Bodily - bass guitar
Terry Crisp - steel guitar, lap steel guitar
Dan Dugmore - steel guitar
Rob Hajacos - fiddle
Bobby Jensen - piano, organ
Chris LeDoux - lead vocals
Bill Livsey - Wurlitzer electric piano, organ, harmonium
Dennis Locorriere - background vocals
Carl Marsh - keyboards
Terry McMillan - Harmonica
Dana McVicker - background vocals
Brent Rowan - acoustic guitar, electric guitar
Mark Sissel - electric guitar
K.W. Turnbow - drums

Chart performance

Sources

CMT
Allmusic
AOL Music

1994 albums
Chris LeDoux albums
Liberty Records albums